John Edwards (15 August 1909 – 12 July 1976) was a Barbadian cricketer. He played in six first-class matches for the Barbados cricket team from 1931 to 1938.

See also
 List of Barbadian representative cricketers

References

External links
 

1909 births
1976 deaths
Barbadian cricketers
Barbados cricketers
People from Christ Church, Barbados